Samuel Moore or More may refer to:

Samuel Moore

Politics
 Samuel B. Moore (1789–1846), sixth Governor of Alabama
 Samuel M. Moore (1796–1875), U.S. Representative from Virginia
 Samuel Edward Moore (1803–1849), Western Australian politician
 Samuel Moore (colonial official) (1630–1688), New Jersey politician
 Samuel Moore (congressman) (1774–1861), U.S. Representative from Pennsylvania
 Samuel Wilkinson Moore (1854–1935), New South Wales Parliamentarian and Minister
 Sam Moore (Georgia politician) (born 1976), member of the Georgia House of Representatives
 Samuel Joseph Fortescue Moore, a member of the Western Australian Legislative Assembly in the early 1900s

Sports
 Sam Moore (gridiron football) (born 1964), American player of gridiron football
 Sammy Moore (born 1987), English footballer
 Sam Moore (rugby union) (born 1998), rugby union player
 Sam Moore (soccer), American soccer player

Other
 Sam Moore (born 1935), singer from the soul duo Sam & Dave
 Samuel P. Moore (1813–1889), U.S. Army doctor and Confederate Army surgeon general
 Samuel N. Moore (1891–1942), U.S. Navy officer, namesake for the destroyer USS Samuel N. Moore
 Samuel Moore (Quaker leader) (1742–1821), early Quaker leader in Maritime Canada
 Samuel J. Moore (1859–1948), Canadian businessman, founder of Moore Business Forms
 Samuel Moore (translator) (1838–1911), translator of the 1887 English edition of Das Kapital

Samuel More
 Samuel More (1593–1662)
Samuel More (1726-1799), apothecary
 Samuel More (MP), Member of Parliament (MP) for Shropshire